The RABe 501, nicknamed Giruno, is a high-speed electric multiple unit train built by Stadler Rail of Switzerland for the Swiss Federal Railways (SBB). According to Stadler Rail, it is the world's first single-decker low-floor high-speed train.

The trains are intended to replace the ETR610 trains on the trans-Alpine route between Milan (Italy) and Basel / Zürich, with eventually further connections with Germany and Austria. The main route goes through the 57 kilometre-long Gotthard Base Tunnel. As a consequence, the Giruno is also referred to as the "Gotthard train".

Two train sets can be coupled together to accommodate over 800 passengers.

Names 
Stadler originally named the train the EC250. This was changed in 2017 to SMILE, short for Schneller Mehrsystemfähiger Innovativer Leichter Expresszug (English: “speedy multi-system innovative lightweight express train”). The SBB have named the train Giruno (Romansh: "Buzzard").

Development 
In April 2012, Swiss Federal Railways (SBB) issued a tender for 29 new single-deck trains, capable of reaching 250 km/h, for service on routes between Germany, Switzerland and Italy via the then under-construction Gotthard Base Tunnel, the only completely flat route through the great Alpine barrier. Bids were placed by Stadler Rail (Switzerland), Siemens (Germany), Alstom (France) and Talgo (Spain). All four bids were rejected by SBB and a second round took place, at which point Siemens withdrew. On 9 May 2014 SBB announced an order worth  for 29 Stadler EC250s. The final signing was delayed, however, as Alstom and Talgo both launched legal challenges: Alstom withdrew theirs in September 2014, while Talgo's complaintthat SBB gave the domestic producer an advantagewas dismissed by the Federal Administrative Court in October 2014. The final contract was signed between SBB and Stadler on 30 October 2014.

The EC250's first public appearanceas a short 5-car setwas at InnoTrans 2016 in Berlin, Germany, by Stadler CEO, Peter Spuhler, and SBB CEO, Andreas Meyer. The first full 11-car set was presented at a ceremony in Bussnang on 18 May 2017, which was also attended by the then Swiss President Doris Leuthard. Shortly afterwards in August, the EC250 was renamed as SMILE following a public competition.

As SBB intend to operate these trains across several countries, testing had to be carried out in Germany, Italy and Austria, in addition to Switzerland. In early April 2018, a test train unit ran through the Gotthard Tunnel at 275 km/h in order to meet approval conditions to operate up to 250 km/h on the line. The Federal Office of Transport approved this service for Switzerland on 4 April 2019 and the European Union Railway Agency approved it for Italy in March 2020in both cases, for speeds up to 200 km/h.

The first passenger revenue service operated between Zürich and Erstfeld on 8 May 2019, using Giruno unit 501 006.

Future Philippine National Railways (PNR) Bicol Express EMUs will be based on Stadler EC250 and no longer using passenger carriages pulled by conventional locomotives.

Design

The EC250 is designed to comply with the TSI-High-speed regulations and meets the EN 15227 crashworthiness standards.

The cars are connected to Jacobs bogies and the propulsion system consists of four motorised bogies, powered from four roof-mounted electric current collectors. The electrification system is compatible with the Swiss and German 15 kV 16.7 Hz alternating current (AC) overhead power supplies, as well as with Italian 3 kV direct current (DC) and 25 kV 50 Hz electrification systems. The motorized bogies are reportedly capable of generating a maximum power output of 6000 kW.

Each carriage has a width of 2.9 m and a height of 4.25 m. The wheelbase of the unpowered bogies is 2.7 m, while those of the motorised bogies are 2.75 m. The carriages do not have a uniform floor height as the seats at either end of each car are positioned above the bogies while the central aisle rises towards the carriage connection through ramps.
 
The low-floor entrances allow step-free access from platforms at heights between 550 mm and 760 mm and several accessible toilets and areas for wheelchairs are available, allowing the train to comply with the Law on Equal Rights for Persons with Disabilities. As a long-distance train, it also features signal boosters for 3G/4G cellular phone networks, power sockets (for Swiss and international plugs) and large luggage racks for passenger comfort, along with energy-efficient lighting. The interior is flexible, meaning it can be extensively refitted and modified to an operator's requirements.

Service

As of December 2020, Giruno units operate services from Basel and Zürich to Chiasso and Lugano. Services between Zurich and Milan have also operated since 12 August 2020, and have later expanded to Venice, Genoa and Bologna.

The Giruno replaced existing RABDe 500 (ICN) and tilting ETR 610 units on the Gotthard railway, which were reassigned to more winding Alpine routes such as the Jura Foot Railway.

References 

High-speed trains
Stadler Rail multiple units
Multiple units of Switzerland
3000 V DC multiple units
25 kV AC multiple units
15 kV AC multiple units
Passenger trains running at least at 250 km/h in commercial operations